USS Chimon (AG-150/AKS-31) – also known as USS LST-1102 -- was an  launched by the U.S. Navy during the final months of World War II. Chimon served as a transport and stores ship for the U.S. 7th Fleet, and was decommissioned after service in the Korean War.

Constructed in Evansville, Indiana 
Chimon was launched as LST-1102 10 January 1945 by Missouri Valley Bridge and Iron Works, Evansville, Indiana; sponsored by Mrs. O. Snyder; and commissioned 29 January 1945.

World War II-related service 
Sailing from Gulfport, Mississippi, 7 March 1945, LST-1102 arrived at Pearl Harbor 4 April to load cargo for delivery to bases at Kwajalein, Eniwetok, and Ulithi.

This duty completed, she joined a convoy at Leyte 21 June and arrived at Okinawa 5 days later to complete offloading her cargo. After transporting Marines from Naha to Hagushi, she sailed from Okinawa 10 July and returned to Pearl Harbor 5 August. At the close of the war, she loaded men and equipment for the occupation of Japan, and on 27 September arrived at Wakayama, Japan.
 
LST-1102 continued to support the occupation of Japan until 4 November 1945. She called at Guam to embark homeward bound servicemen and arrived back at Pearl Harbor 1 December to undergo conversion to a mobile spare parts ship.

Converted into a spare parts ship
Her conversion completed, LST-1102 got underway from Pearl Harbor 4 April 1946 to return to Far Eastern duty at Shanghai, and Tsingtao, China until 8 October 1947. Arriving at San Pedro, California, 7 November, she shifted to San Diego, California, a week later and was placed out of commission in reserve there 21 November 1947.

She was reclassified AG-150, 27 January 1949 and assigned the name Chimon on 1 February 1949.

Korean War service 
Recommissioned 27 December 1950  Chimon was assigned to Service Squadron 3 and sailed for the Far East on 2 May 1951. Arriving at Sasebo, Japan, 13 June, she alternated operations from that port and Yokosuka in support of the Korean War.

Reclassified AKS-31 on 18 August 1951, she remained in the Far East serving the 7th Fleet in its watchful operations to keep peace until 20 November 1957, occasionally visiting Hong Kong and the Philippines.

Post-war decommissioning
Arriving at San Francisco, California, 22 December, Chimon was placed in commission in reserve 22 January 1958 and out of commission in reserve 22 April 1958. Chimon was sold, and removed from naval custody on 2 November 1959.

Honors and awards 
Chimon received one battle star (as LST-1102) for World War II service.

References
  
 NavSource Online: Amphibious Photo Archive - LST-1102 - AG-150 / AKS-31 Chimon

Specific

 

Ships built in Evansville, Indiana
World War II amphibious warfare vessels of the United States
Korean War auxiliary ships of the United States
Cold War auxiliary ships of the United States
1945 ships
LST-542-class tank landing ships converted to stores ships
LST-542-class tank landing ships